Celebration – Forty Years of Rock is a greatest hits album by British rock band Uriah Heep. It mainly features rerecorded classics – which, said bassist Trevor Bolder, "chose themselves, really. The likes of 'Sunrise', 'Gypsy' and 'Look at Yourself' are songs we still play today. We just went in and redid them. [Drummer] Russell [Gilbrook] is a bit of an animal, so they sound livelier than ever."
Two tracks were written specifically for this release: 'Only Human' ("A bit of an '80s vibe," said Bolder) and 'Corridors of Madness'. A double special edition, in digipak format, features a live DVD recorded at the Sweden Rock Festival. A collector's edition adds a vinyl single; its two songs also recorded at the Sweden Rock Festival, and not included on the DVD.

Celebration was released in most European territories on 6 October 2009; on 26 October 2009 in the UK; and approximately one month later in the United States.

In 2015, keyboardist Phil Lanzon released a music video for "Corridors of Madness", featuring footage filmed on tour in Israel and the United States.

Track listings

Personnel
Uriah Heep
 Bernie Shaw – lead vocals
 Mick Box – guitar, vocals
 Phil Lanzon – keyboards, vocals
 Trevor Bolder – bass guitar, vocals
 Russell Gilbrook – drums, vocals

Production
Mike Paxman – producer
Steve Rispin – engineer
Mark 'Tufty' Evans – mixing at Wispington Studios, Cookham, Berkshire, UK

References 

2009 remix albums
Uriah Heep (band) albums
Edel AG albums
Albums produced by Mike Paxman